Open mapping theorem may refer to:

 Open mapping theorem (functional analysis) (also known as the Banach–Schauder theorem), states that a surjective continuous linear transformation of a Banach space X onto a Banach space Y is an open mapping
 Open mapping theorem (complex analysis), states that a non-constant holomorphic function on a connected open set in the complex plane is an open mapping
 Open mapping theorem (topological groups), states that a surjective continuous homomorphism of a locally compact Hausdorff group G onto a locally compact Hausdorff group H is an open mapping if G is σ-compact. Like the open mapping theorem in functional analysis, the proof in the setting of topological groups uses the Baire category theorem.